The  was a DC electric multiple unit (EMU) commuter train type operated by the private railway operator Tobu Railway in Japan between 1979 and 2006.

The 5000 series was created between 1978 and 1986 by modernizing the entire fleet of 162 former 7800 series EMU cars, built between 1953 and 1961, by adding new steel bodies based on the 8000 series design. The fleet was subdivided into 5000, 5050, and 5070 series types.

Variants
 5000 series: 4-car 5000 series and 2-car 5500 series sets
 5050 series: 4-car 5050 series and 2-car 5550 series sets
 5070 series: 6-car sets

5000 series

The first 12 former 7800 series cars were rebuilt between November 1978 and August 1979, reformed as two four-car 5000 series sets and two two-car 5500 series sets. These sets were initially not air-conditioned, and used the ventilators and motor generators removed from 8000 series sets that had been refurbished with air-conditioning. These four sets were also subsequently modified with air-conditioning between July 1984 and March 1985.

The 5000 series sets were all withdrawn by 2003.

Formations
The four-car 5000 series and two-car 5500 series sets operated on the Tobu Tojo Line, and were formed as follows with the 5100 and 5500 cars at the Ikebukuro end.

4-car 5000 series

The 5300 cars were fitted with two pantographs.

2-car 5500 series

The 5500 cars were fitted with one pantograph.

5050 series

Following on from the earlier 5000 series sets, a total of 72 7800 series cars were rebuilt between 1981 and March 1984 as two-car 5550 and four-car 5050 series sets. Unlike the earlier 5000 series sets, the 5050 series sets were air-conditioned.

The trains were removed from regular service in late 2006, with a sayonara final run on 16 December, and were entirely withdrawn by February 2007.

Formations
The four-car 5050 series were formed as follows.

4-car 5050 series

The 5250 cars were fitted with two pantographs.

2-car 5550 series

The 5550 cars were fitted with one pantograph.

5070 series

13 six-car 5070 series sets (78 vehicles) were built between June 1984 and March 1986 by modernizing former 7800 series EMU cars with new 8000-series-style bodies and air conditioning. The fleet operated on the Noda Line, but were gradually replaced from 1997 by six-car 8000 series EMUs displaced by the arrival of new 30000 series EMUs on the Tobu Isesaki Line, with the entire fleet withdrawn from service by the start of the revised timetable on 19 October 2004.

Formations
The 6-car 5070 series sets were formed as follows.

The 5270 cars were fitted with two pantographs, and the 5570 cars were fitted with one pantograph.

Specifications
Tobu 5000 series trains had car bodies based on the Tobu 8000 series, each having a length of 20m. The traction motors were resistor controlled.

References

Electric multiple units of Japan
5000 series
Train-related introductions in 1979